The 90 mm gun M1/M2/M3 was an American heavy anti-aircraft and anti-tank gun, playing a role similar to the German 8.8cm Flak 18.

The 90 mm gun was the US Army's primary heavy anti-aircraft gun from just prior to the opening of World War II into 1946, complemented by small numbers of the much larger 120 mm M1 gun. Both were widely deployed in the United States postwar as the Cold War presented a perceived threat from Soviet bombers. The anti-aircraft guns were phased out in the middle 1950s as their role was taken over by surface-to-air missiles such as the MIM-3 Nike Ajax.

As a tank gun it was the main weapon of the M36 tank destroyer and M26 Pershing tank, as well as a number of post-war tanks like the M56 Scorpion. It was also briefly deployed from 1943–1946 as a coast defense weapon with the United States Army Coast Artillery Corps. Each gun cost roughly $50,000 to make in 1940 and utilized up to 30 separate contractors to manufacture.

History
Prior to World War II, the primary US anti-aircraft guns were the 3-inch M1918 gun (76.2 mm L/40) and 3-inch anti-aircraft gun M3 (76.2 mm L/50), a widely used caliber for this class of weapon. Similar weapons were in British, Soviet and other arsenals. There had been several upgrades to the weapon over its history, including the experimental T8 and T9 versions developed in the early 1930s, that were intended to enter service later in that decade.

The new design seemed so much better than developments of the older three-inch that work on the three-inch T9 was canceled in 1938, just as it became production-ready. By 1940, the second development of the 90 mm design, the T2, was standardized as the 90 mm M1, while its larger cousin became the 120 mm M1 gun.

A few hundred M1s were completed when several improvements were added to produce the 90 mm M1A1, which entered production in late 1940, and was accepted as the standard on May 22, 1941. The M1A1 included an improved mount and spring-rammer on the breech, with the result that firing rates went up to 20 rounds per minute. Several thousand were available when the US entered the war, and the M1A1 was their standard anti-aircraft gun for the rest of the conflict. Production rates continued to improve, topping out in a few thousand per month.

Like the German 88 and the British QF 3.7 inch AA gun, the M1A1 was used against tanks in combat but, unlike the others, it could not be depressed to fire against them. On September 11, 1942, the Army issued specifications for a new mount to allow it to be used in this role, which resulted in the 90 mm M2, introducing yet another new mount, one that could be depressed to 10 degrees below the horizontal and featured a new electrically-assisted rammer. It became the standard weapon from May 13, 1943.

Anti-aircraft operation

In anti-aircraft use, the guns were normally operated in groups of four, controlled by the M7 or M9 gun director or Kerrison predictors. Radar direction was common, starting with the SCR-268 in 1941, which was not accurate enough to directly lay the guns, but provided accurate ranging throughout the engagement. For night-time use, a searchlight was slaved to the radar with a beam width set so that the target would be somewhere in the beam when it was turned on, at which point the engagement continued as in the day. In 1944, the system was upgraded with the addition of the SCR-584 microwave radar, which was accurate to about 0.06 degrees (1 mil) and also provided automatic tracking. With the SCR-584, direction and range information was sent directly to the Bell Labs M3 gun data computer, and M9 director, which could direct and lay the guns automatically, all the crews had to do was load the guns.

Main anti-tank developments
The M3 was also adapted as the main gun for various armored vehicles, starting with the experimental T7 which was accepted as the 90 mm M3. The test firing of the M3 took place on an M10 tank destroyer in early 1943. The M3 gun was used on the M36 tank destroyer, and the T26 (later, M26) Pershing tank. However, both the muzzle velocity of the standard M3 gun and the quality of the steel used in the M82 APC (armor-piercing capped) shot, while comparable to the 8.8 cm KwK 36 L/56 mounted on the Tiger I, were inferior to the Tiger II's KwK 43 L/71 8.8 cm main gun firing its standard APCBC (armor-piercing capped ballistic cap) shot used by German forces, with the result that the former's penetration fell far short of the standard projectile fired by that German tank. The HVAP could compete with the KwK 43's penetration performance when firing standard APCBC, but tungsten ammunition was always in short supply.

Performance

An unsuccessful anti-tank variant was the T8 gun on the T5 carriage. The gun was an M1 with the recoil mechanism from the M2A1 105 mm howitzer. Eventually a version of the T8 with the T20E1 gun and T15 carriage was tested; this led to the 105 mm anti-tank gun T8.

Because the standard fifteen-and-a-half foot long M3 90 mm main tank gun proved incapable of penetrating the heaviest frontal armor of the heaviest German tanks such as the Tiger II tank and the rarer Jagdtiger tank destroyer variant, a number of improved versions of the M3 were developed, including the T14 which included a standard muzzle brake and the T15 series.

High-velocity 90 mm gun T15 performance 
The T15 90 mm L/73 anti-tank gun utilized many types of armor piercing ammunition.

 T43 APBC: A solid shot, it was a modified T33 for use by the T15.
 T41 APCBC: Modified M82 projectile of the M3 cannon, fired at a much higher velocity of 3,200 ft/s, than the normal 2,670 ft/s.
 T44 HVAP: Modified M304(T30E16) for use out of the T15.
 T50 APCBC: An M82 projectile with increased nose hardness and overall better design. Same muzzle velocity 3,200 ft/s, but increased penetration, equal to the KwK43.  against vertical armor at point-blank range.

Two versions of the T15 were made: the T15E1 with single-piece ammunition and the T15E2 with two-piece ammunition.

By mid-March 1945, a T26E1 pilot was equipped with the 90 mm T15E1 and was sent to Europe in a ''trial by combat''. It was given to the 3rd Armor Division where it was enhanced with additional armor plates. Its gun was fired in anger on only one occasion, on April 4, 1945, where it engaged and destroyed a German armored vehicle, probably a Tiger I or Panther, at a range of  during the fighting along the Weser River.
According to the memoirs of John P. Irwin, it knocked out a King Tiger in Dessau as well as a Panzer IV and a Panther.

Near the end of World War II, more experimental versions of the 90 mm gun were tested including the higher-velocity T18 and T19 main guns. The T19 was a T18 modified in an attempt to reduce barrel wear. Other versions included the T21, which was intended for wheeled vehicles, and the T22, which used the breech from the standard 105 mm M2 howitzer. The T21 and T22 were designed to use larger powder charges. None of these versions entered service.

In the post-World War II era, development of the T15 continued redesignated as the T54, which used a slightly shorter and fatter propellent casing than that of the T15E1. The T54 served as the main gun on the M26E1 Pershing.

Further developments 
In 1948 an improved version of the M3A1, designated as the T119, was designed to be used on the T42 (and later M47 Patton) and had a higher muzzle velocity using new ammunition loaded to produce higher chamber pressures. The new ammunition had a slightly longer shoulder to prevent accidental chambering in the older M3 variants. The T119 was backwards compatible with the ammunition used on the M3A1. Upon standardization of the M47 in 1951, the T119 was redesignated as the 90 mm gun M36.

The lightweight variant of the T119, designated as the T139 and standardized as the 90 mm gun M41, equipped the M48 Patton tanks used in the Vietnam War. The M41 with a modified recoil system was mounted as the 90 mm gun M54 on the M56 Scorpion anti-tank vehicle.

Coast artillery

During World War II the Coast Artillery Corps adopted the 90 mm M1 to supplement or replace aging three-inch guns in harbor defense commands in CONUS and US territories. The guns were organized in anti-motor torpedo boat (AMTB) batteries, typically with four 90 mm guns and two 37 mm or 40 mm AA guns each. Typically two of the 90 mm guns were on T3/M3 fixed mounts and two were on towed M1A1 or M2 mounts, with the 37 mm or 40 mm weapons on single towed mounts. The T3/M3 mount was designed for anti-surface or anti-aircraft fire. Emplacements for at least 90 batteries of two fixed guns each, plus mobile weapons, were constructed in CONUS, Panama, Alaska, Hawaii, Puerto Rico, and elsewhere in 1943.

Variants

M1
Towed anti-aircraft gun. Approved for service in 1940.
Fixed on T3/M3 mount for coastal artillery service

M1A1
Towed anti-aircraft gun. Production began in 1940. It featured the M8A1 spring rammer. Its rate of fire was 20 rounds per minute.

M2
A complete redesign to make the gun dual role, functioning as an anti-tank gun as well as an anti-aircraft gun. The ammunition feed was upgraded and an automatic fuze setter-rammer, the M20, was added. This enabled the rate of fire to reach up to 24 rounds per minute. Elevation was improved with the gun able to depress to −10 degrees. To protect the crew, a large metal shield was added. The M2 was the standard weapon by May 13, 1943. From the march it could fire from its wheels in three minutes, and from a fully emplaced position in seven minutes. In 1944 the weapon was enhanced with the addition of proximity fused shells.

M3
A tank-anti-tank version of the gun. It was used to equip the M36 tank destroyer and the M26 Pershing tank. It is also known as the 90 mm L/53.

M3A1
M3 gun with single baffle muzzle brake and bore evacuator, used on M46 Patton and early versions of the M48 Patton tanks and refurbished M36 tank destroyers during the Korean War.

M3 ammunition
 M71 HE –  (projectile)
 M77 AP –  (projectile)
 M82 APC –  (projectile)

Surviving examples
 One AAA at Fort Irwin NTC, California, post museum
 One, possibly M1, Travis AFB, Fairfield, California, near the entrance to the skeet range
 One AAA at CFB Borden, Ontario, Canada
 One AAA at Labelle, Quebec, Canada
 One AAA at Sangudo, Alberta, Canada. 
 One AAA at Whycocomagh, Nova Scotia, Canada.
 Two AAA at CFB Shilo, Manitoba, Canada, RCA Museum
 One AAA at Shilo, Manitoba, Canada (private collection)
 One AAA at Lemberg, Saskatchewan, Canada (private collection)
 One AAA at Colwood, British Columbia, Canada, Fort Rodd Hill
 One at Savannah, Georgia, National Guard Fairgrounds
 One at Arundel, Quebec, Canada, Legion Hall
 One AAA at Sault Ste. Marie, Ontario, Canada
 One AAA M2 at Fort Sill, Oklahoma, US Army Air Defense Artillery Museum.
 One AAA M1A1 at Fort Sill, Oklahoma, US Army Air Defense Artillery Museum.
 One AAA M2A2 at Fort Sill, Oklahoma, US Army Air Defense Artillery Museum
 One AAA M1A1 at Fort Sill, Oklahoma, 31st ADA Brigade
 One AAA M1A1 at US Veterans Memorial Museum, Huntsville, AL
 One AAA at Broadalbin, New York.
 One AAA at Roswell, New Mexico
 One AAA at Greenville, South Carolina
 One AAA at Anderson, South Carolina, VFW post
 One AAA at Deming, New Mexico, Deming Luna Mimbres Museum
 One AAA at Sainte-Marie-du-Mont, Manche, France, Utah Beach D-Day Museum. This gun belonged to the 116th AAA Gun Battalion and was lost in the Channel 6 June 1944. The gun was recovered by locals after the war.
 One AAA M1A3 (built 1954) at Raton, New Mexico
 One AAA M1A1 at Halifax, Nova Scotia, Royal Artillery Park
 One AAA M1A1 at Fort Bliss, Texas, Fort Bliss Museum
 One AAA M1A1 at Linthicum, Maryland, National Electronics Museum
 Two Anti/Tank T-8 at Fort Benning, Georgia, U.S. Army Armor & Cavalry Collection.
 One M1A3 at Reidsville, Georgia, National Guard Armory
 One M1A3 at Campinas, São Paulo, Brazil, located at an open museum which belongs to the 11ª Brigade of the Brazilian Army
 One seacoast M1 (No. 6931 Chevrolet) on barbette, carriage Model T3, at Battery Parrott, Fort Monroe, Virginia
 One seacoast M1 on barbette, carriage Model T3 (shield scrapped), Eareckson Air Station (formerly Shemya AFB), Shemya, Alaska, outside Bldg 600 
 One seacoast on barbette, carriage Model T3, at San Pedro, California, Fort MacArthur Military Museum, (the museum has several barrels and was restoring at least one weapon as of October 2014)
 Two AAA M1A1s in Moscow, Russia, Museum of the Great Patriotic War, supplied as Lend-Lease during WWII
 One 90 mm M2A1 at Tucson, Arizona, Pima Air & Space Museum
 One M1A3 at Historical Military Museum of Cartagena (Spain)
 One at the Kalmthoutse Heide, Belgium
 One at Ft Miles Artillery Museum, Delaware

See also
 184th AAA Battalion (United States)
 Fire-control system
 List of U.S. Army weapons by supply catalog designation
 Rangekeeper
 Seacoast defense in the United States

Weapons of comparable role, performance and era
 8.8 cm Flak 18/36/37/41: contemporary German anti-aircraft gun
 8.8 cm KwK 36: contemporary German tank gun, mounted on Tiger I Tanks
 Cannone da 90/53: contemporary Italian anti-aircraft gun
 QF 3.7-inch AA gun: contemporary British anti-aircraft gun, firing a  shell
 85 mm air defense gun M1939 (52-K): contemporary Soviet anti-aircraft gun

References

 TM 9-2300 standard artillery and fire control material. dated 1944
 TM 9-370
 TM 9-1370
 SNL D-28

External links

 United States War Department TM 9-374 Technical Manual 90-MM Gun M3 Mounted in Combat Vehicles. 11 September 1944
 M3 armor penetration table
 List of all US coastal forts and batteries at the Coastal Defense Study Group, Inc. website
 FortWiki, lists all CONUS and Canadian forts
 

World War II anti-aircraft guns
World War II anti-tank guns
World War II tank guns
Anti-aircraft guns of the United States
Anti-tank guns of the United States
Tank guns of the United States
World War II artillery of the United States
Coastal artillery
90 mm artillery
Military equipment introduced in the 1930s